Alfred Sullivan (10 December 1872 – 25 September 1942) was an Australian cricketer. He played three first-class matches for New South Wales between 1904/05 and 1906/07.

See also
 List of New South Wales representative cricketers

References

External links
 

1872 births
1942 deaths
Australian cricketers
New South Wales cricketers
Cricketers from Sydney